Matthew James (born September 11, 1955 in Norfolk, Virginia) is a former Democratic member of the Virginia House of Delegates from the 80th district, comprising parts of the cities Norfolk, Portsmouth, and Chesapeake.

He won his seat in the 2009 election after defeating Republican Jennifer Lee in the general election by nearly forty points. He succeeded incumbent Kenneth Melvin, who resigned in May 2009 to become a judge.

References

External links
 Official bio
 Candidate website

Living people
1955 births
Democratic Party members of the Virginia House of Delegates
African-American state legislators in Virginia
Politicians from Norfolk, Virginia
Politicians from Portsmouth, Virginia
21st-century American politicians
21st-century African-American politicians
20th-century African-American people